Harry St John Bridger Philby, CIE (3 April 1885 – 30 September 1960), also known as Jack Philby or Sheikh Abdullah, was a British Arabist, adviser, explorer, writer, and a colonial intelligence officer who served as an advisor to King Abdulaziz al-Saud, the founder of Saudi Arabia.

As he states in his autobiography, he "became something of a fanatic" and in 1908 "the first Socialist to join the Indian Civil Service". After studying Oriental languages at the University of Cambridge, he was posted to Lahore in the Punjab in 1908, acquiring fluency in Urdu, Punjabi, Baluchi, Persian and eventually Arabic. He converted to Islam in 1930 and later became an adviser to Ibn Saud, urging him to unite the Arabian Peninsula under Saudi rule, and helping him to negotiate with the United Kingdom and the United States when petroleum was discovered in 1938. His second marriage was to a Saudi Arabian woman, Rozy al-Abdul Aziz.

His only son by his first wife, Dora Johnston, was Kim Philby, who became known worldwide as a double agent for the Soviet Union who defected in 1963. Khaled Philby, one of his three sons with his second wife, is the former United Nations Resident Coordinator (equivalent to an ambassador) in, among others, Kuwait and Turkmenistan.

Early life

Born in Badulla in British Ceylon (now Sri Lanka), the son of a tea planter, he was educated at Westminster School and Trinity College, Cambridge, where he studied oriental languages under Edward Granville Browne, and was a friend and classmate of Jawaharlal Nehru, who later became the first prime minister of independent India. Philby married Dora Johnston in September 1910, with his distant cousin Bernard Law Montgomery as best man. In addition to their son, Kim, born in 1912, they had three daughters: Diana, Helena and Patricia.

Arabist
In late 1915, Percy Cox recruited Philby as head of the finance branch of the British administration in Baghdad. The position included fixing compensation for property and business owners. The mission was to organise the Arab Revolt against the Ottoman Turks and to protect the oil fields near Basra and the Shatt al Arab, which were a source of fuel for the Royal Navy. The revolt was organised with the promise of creating a unified Arab state, or Arab federation, from Aleppo, Syria, to Aden, Yemen. Gertrude Bell was his first controller and taught him the finer arts of espionage. In 1916 he became Revenue Commissioner for the British Occupied Territories.

In November 1917, Philby was sent to the interior of the Arabian Peninsula as head of a mission to Ibn Saud, the chieftain who professed Wahhabism, the movement within Sunni Islam, and a bitter enemy of Hussein bin Ali, Sharif of Mecca, who led the Hashemites and the Arab Revolt, who were both contenders for "King of the Arabs". Philby secretly began to favour Ibn Saud even though British policy supported Sherif Hussein. Philby completed a crossing from Riyadh to Jeddah by a "backdoor" route to demonstrate that Saud, not Hussein, was in control of the Arabian highlands.

In November 1918, Britain and France issued the Anglo-French Declaration to the Arabs, which promised self-determination. Philby felt there was a betrayal of that assurance, along with others made in the Balfour Declaration and the Sykes-Picot Agreement, of the promise of a single unified Arab nation. Philby argued that Ibn Saud was a "democrat" guiding his affairs "by mutual counsel", as laid out in the Quran, in contrast to George Curzon's support for Hussein. After the 1920 Iraqi revolt against the British, Philby was appointed Minister of Internal Security in Mandatory Iraq.

In November 1921, Philby was named chief head of the Secret Service in Mandatory Palestine, worked with T. E. Lawrence and met his American counterpart, Allen Dulles. In late 1922, Philby travelled to London for extensive meetings with parties involved in the Palestine question, included Winston Churchill, George V, Edward, Prince of Wales, Walter Rothschild, 2nd Baron Rothschild, Wickham Steed and Chaim Weizmann.

Adviser to Ibn Saud
Philby's view was that the interests of both the British and the Saud family would be best served by uniting the Arabian Peninsula under one government stretching from the Red Sea to the Persian Gulf, with the Saudis supplanting the Hashemites as Islamic "Keepers of the Holy Places" and protecting shipping lanes along the Suez Canal–Aden–Mumbai (then Bombay) route.

Philby was forced to resign his post in 1924 over differences about allowing Jewish immigration to Palestine. He was found to have had unauthorised correspondence with Ibn Saud and to have sent confidential information, which carried with it the connotation of espionage. Shortly afterward, 
Ibn Saud began to call for the overthrow of the Hashemite dynasty, with Philby advising him on how far he could go in occupying Arabia without incurring the wrath of the British, the principal power in the Middle East. In 1925, Philby claimed that Ibn Saud had brought unprecedented order into Arabia.

Philby settled in Jeddah and became a partner in a trading company. Over the next few years, he became famous as an international writer and explorer. Philby personally mapped on camel back what is now the Saudi–Yemeni border on the Rub' al Khali. In his unique position, he became Ibn Saud's chief adviser in dealing with the British Empire and the other Western powers. He converted to Islam in 1930. In 1931, Philby invited Charles Richard Crane to Jeddah to facilitate exploration of the kingdom's subsoil oil. Crane was accompanied by noted historian George Antonius, who acted as translator.

In May 1932, Standard Oil of California (SoCal) sought out Philby in its quest to obtain an oil concession in Saudi Arabia, ultimately signing Philby as a paid adviser to SoCal. Philby, in turn, recognised that competition by foreign interests would get a better deal for the Saudi king, made contact with George Martin Lees, the chief geologist of the Anglo-Persian Oil Company, to alert him to SoCal's interest in gaining oil exploration rights in Saudi Arabia. Anglo-Persian was one of five international partners in the Iraq Petroleum Company (IPC) through which it pursued its interest in the Saudi concession. In March 1933, IPC sent a representative, Stephen Longrigg, to join negotiations with the Saudi government in Jeddah. However, Philby's primary loyalty was to the Saudi king. Although he was being paid by SoCal, he kept the arrangement a secret from Longrigg. In May 1933, IPC instructed Longrigg to withdraw from Jeddah and to leave SoCal free to conclude negotiations with Saudi Arabia for a 60-year contract to obtain the exclusive concession for exploration and extraction of oil in the al-Hasa region along the Persian Gulf.

By 1934, in an effort to safeguard the port of Aden, Britain had no fewer than 1,400 "peace treaties" with the various tribal rulers of the hinterlands of what became Yemen. Philby undermined British influence in the region, however, by facilitating the entry of American commercial interests, followed by a political alliance between the US and the Saud dynasty.

In 1936, SoCal and Texaco pooled their assets together into what later became ARAMCO (Arabian–American Oil Company). The United States Department of State described ARAMCO as the richest commercial prize in the history of the planet.<ref>{{cite web|url=http://www.historycommons.org/context.jsp?item=USDOSMemoSaudiOilisPrize|title=Context of '1945: US State Department Official Calls Saudi Oil 'One of the Greatest Material Prizes in World History}}</ref> Philby represented Saudi interests. In 1937 when the Spanish Civil War broke out, Philby arranged for his son, Kim Philby, to become a war correspondent for The Times.

Philby later began secret negotiations with Germany and Spain on Saudi Arabia's role in the event of a general European war. The discussions allowed neutral Saudi Arabia to sell oil to neutral Spain, which would then be transported to Germany. John Loftus, who worked in the United States Department of Justice Office of Special Investigations Nazi-hunting unit, claimed that Adolf Eichmann, on a mission to the Middle East, met with Philby "during the mid-1930s".

Philby Plan
Philby, then known as an anti-Zionist, outlined a plan to reach a compromise with Zionism, after consultation with Arab leaders, and it was reported in The New York Times in October 1929. The Philby Plan foresaw a shared confirmation of the Balfour Declaration and continued Jewish immigration into Palestine in exchange for a renunciation by Zionists of any desire to seek political dominance. Representation of the two groups would be based on respecting the numerical proportions between both groups. Judah Magnes, chancellor of the Hebrew University of Jerusalem, and a member of Brit Shalom, reacted to the proposal positively, and suggested alterations in order to secure guarantees for the Jewish minority.
 
As related in his memoirs, David Ben Gurion, who would become Israel's first prime minister, met Philby on 18 May 1937 at the Athenaeum Club, London. Ben Gurion attempted to use Philby as an intermediary to reach an agreement between the Zionist Movement and King Ibn Saud. A few days after their meeting, Philby sent to Ben Gurion a draft treaty by which the Zionists would renounce the Balfour Declaration in exchange for being welcomed to the Middle East by an Arab Federation, headed by Ibn Saud. However, several clauses of the draft treaty were unacceptable to Ben Gurion. In particular, Philby had proposed that Palestine would be "open to the immigration of all those seeking to become its citizens, regardless of race and creed" and refused to mention specific Jewish immigration. To Ben Gurion, that would have defeated the whole aim of Zionism. Ben Gurion sent Philby a counterproposal based on what Ben Gurion regarded as the indispensable minimum Zionist aspirations to which Philby never replied.

Philby, previously a member of the Labour Party, fought a by-election held on 20 July 1939 for the parliamentary constituency of Hythe, Kent. He stood for the anti-Semitic British People's Party and declared "no cause whatever is worth the spilling of human blood" and the "protection of the small man against big business". He lost his deposit. Soon afterward, the Second World War began. He is recorded as having referred to Adolf Hitler as un homme très fin ("a most sophisticated man").

When he travelled to Bombay, he was arrested on 3 August 1940 under Defence Regulation 18B, deported to England and there briefly interned. Shortly after his release from custody, Philby recommended his son, Kim, to Valentine Vivian, MI6 deputy chief, who recruited him into the British secret service. When Harold B. Hoskins of the United States State Department visited Ibn Saud in August 1943, he asked if the king would be willing to have an intermediary meet with Chaim Weizmann. Ibn Saud angrily responded that he was insulted by the suggestion that he could be bribed for £20 million to accept resettlement of Arabs from Palestine. Hoskins reports the king said Weizmann told him the promise of payment would be "guaranteed by President Roosevelt". A month later Weizmann wrote in a letter to Sumner Welles: "It is conceived on big lines, large enough to satisfy the legitimate aspirations of both Arabs and Jews, and the strategic and economic interests of the United States;... properly managed, Mr. Philby's scheme offers an approach which should not be abandoned".

Suez Crisis
After Ibn Saud died in 1953, Philby openly criticised the successor, King Saud, by saying the royal family's morals were being picked up "in the gutters of the West". He was exiled to Lebanon in 1955. There, he wrote: the true basis of Arab hostility to Jewish immigration into Palestine is xenophobia, and instinctive perception that the vast majority of central and eastern European Jews, seeking admission... are not Semites at all.... Whatever political repercussions of their settlement may be, their advent is regarded as a menace to the Semitic culture of Arabia... the European Jew of today, with his secular outlook... is regarded as an unwelcome intruder within the gates of Arabia.

In Beirut, he reconciled with Kim, and they lived together for a time. The son was reemployed by MI6 as an outside informer on retainer. Philby helped further his son's career by introducing him to his extensive network of contacts in the Middle East, including Lebanese President Camille Chamoun. Both were sympathetic to Gamal Abdel Nasser during the Suez Crisis in August 1956. Between Jack's access to ARAMCO and Kim's access to British intelligence, there was little they did not know about Operation Musketeer, the French and British plan to capture the Suez Canal. The Soviets exposed the entire plan in the United Nations and threatened Britain and France with "long-range guided missiles equipped with atomic warheads".

In 1955, Philby returned to live in Riyadh. In 1960, on a visit to Kim in Beirut, he suddenly became ill and was rushed to hospital. "The man whose life had been so eventful and panoramic, so daring and theatrical, now lay unconscious. He awoke only for a moment and murmured to his son, 'I am so bored'. And then he expired". He is buried in the Muslim cemetery in the Basta district of Beirut. His tombstone reads, "Greatest of Arabian Explorers".

Academic interests

In his travels, he took great interest in wildlife and gave a scientific name to the Arabian woodpecker (Desertipicus (now Dendrocopos) dorae), as well as a subspecies (no longer valid) of a scops owl (Otus scops pamelae). Most of his birds were named after women whom he admired. He contributed numerous specimens to the British Museum. His specimen packages were sometimes used to transport sensitive documents, a skin of a desert fox included survey maps inside it. He also contributed to the draft of a book on the birds of Arabia by George Latimer Bates. It was not published but used in Birds of Arabia (1954) by Richard Meinertzhagen.

Philby is remembered in ornithology by the name of Philby's partridge (Alectoris philbyi).Pocock, R I 1935 The Mammals Collected in S. E. Arabia by Mr. Bartram Thomas and Mr. H. St. J. Philby. Ann. Mag. Nat. Hist., Ser. 10, 15: 441–467.

In 1932, while searching for the lost city of Ubar, he was the first Westerner to visit and describe the Wabar craters.

Awards and legacy
In August 1917, he was appointed a Companion of the Order of the Indian Empire. In 1920, he was awarded the Royal Geographical Society Founder's Medal for his two journeys in South Central Arabia.

A subspecies of Middle Eastern lizard, Uromastyx ornata philbyi, and a partridge, Alectoris philbyi, are named in his honour.

Some authors have summarised Philby as a British traitor and an anti-Semite.John Loftus & Mark Aarons, The Secret War Against the Jews 21, 24, 32, 38, 41–44 (1994) They suggest that Philby never forgave the British government for ending his civil service career for sexual misconduct. Once recruited by MI6, according to those authors, Philby used his intelligence assignment to take revenge on the British government. With the extensive contacts he acquired as a British agent, Philby continued to betray British policy and to resist all efforts at creating a Jewish homeland throughout his life. Philby disclosed classified British intelligence to Ibn Saud during wartime, secretly helped secure American oil concessions in Saudi Arabia, double-crossed British competitors, created economic partnerships allied against British interests and for those of Nazi Germany with the help of Allen Dulles (later CIA Director) and worked with Nazi intelligence to sabotage efforts at creating a Jewish homeland.

Philby's 1955 book Saudi Arabia contains the only known account of the 1931 Saudi–Yemeni border skirimish.

WorksThe Heart of Arabia: A Record of Travel & Exploration. (London: Constable) 1922.Arabia of the Wahhabis. (London: Constable) 1928.Arabia. (London: Ernest Benn) 1930.The Empty Quarter: being a description of the great south desert of Arabia known as Rub 'al Khali (London: Constable & Company Ltd) 1933. scanned bookHarun al Rashid (London: P. Davies) 1933. About Harun al-RashidRoutes in south-west Arabia [map]: From surveys made in 1936 (Methuen & Co Ltd) 1936.Sheba's daughters; being a record of travel in Southern Arabia (London: Methuen & Co Ltd) 1939.A Pilgrim in Arabia (London: The Golden Cockerel Press), [1943].The Background of Islam: being a sketch of Arabian history in pre-Islamic times (Alexandria: Whitehead Morris) 1947.Arabian Days, an autobiography (London: R. Hale) 1948.Arabian Highlands (Ithaca, N.Y.: Cornell University Press) 1952. scanned bookArabian Jubilee (London: Hale) [1952]Sa′udi Arabia (London: Benn) 1955, New impression: Librairie du Liban, Beirut 1968The Land of Midian. (London: Ernest Bean Limited) 1957.Forty Years in the Wilderness (London: R. Hale) c1957.Arabian Oil Ventures (Washington: Middle East Institute) 1964.

See also
 The Prize: The Epic Quest for Oil, Money, and Power 
 Muhammad AsadKing of the SandsReferences

Sources
 Kingmakers: the Invention of the Modern Middle East, Karl E. Meyer and Shareen Blair Brysac, W.W. Norton (2008) pp 226–58.Princes of Darkness, Laurent Murawiec, Rowman and Littlefield (2005)Oxford Dictionary of National Biography, Oxford University Press (2004)Arabian Jubilee, H. StJ. B. Philby, Robert Hale, (1952)Philby of Arabia, Elizabeth Monroe, Pitman Publishing (1973)The Secret War Against the Jews, John Loftus and Mark Aarons, St Martin's Press (1994)Arabia, the Gulf and the West Basic Books (1980)The House of Saud, David Holden and Richard Johns, Holt Rinehart and Winston (1981)The Philby Conspiracy, Bruce Page, David Leitch and Phillip Knightley, Doubleday (1968)Saudi Arabia and the United States, 1931–2002 by Josh Pollack (2002)Mirage: Power, Politics, And the Hidden History of Arabian Oil'', by Aileen Keating, Prometheus Books (2005)

External links

Royal Geographical Society
saudiaramcoworld.com
Middle East Centre Archive, St Antony's College

1885 births
1960 deaths
20th-century explorers
Alumni of Trinity College, Cambridge
Converts to Islam
English Muslims
English ornithologists
People detained under Defence Regulation 18B
Companions of the Order of the Indian Empire
English explorers
English travel writers
Interwar-period spies
British orientalists
World War I spies for the United Kingdom
Explorers of Asia
Explorers of Arabia
British Arabists
People educated at Westminster School, London
20th-century British zoologists
Ibn Saud
Iram of the Pillars